The Chief Directorate: National Geo-spatial Information or CD:NGI (formerly the Chief Directorate: Surveys and Mapping or CD:SM), is the national mapping agency of South Africa. It is part of the Department of Agriculture, Land Reform and Rural Development.

References

External links 
 Official website
 Page on the Department of Rural Development and Land Reform website

National mapping agencies
Geography of South Africa
Government departments of South Africa